Always a Bridesmaid may refer to:

 Always a Bridesmaid (1943 film), American film by Erle C. Kenton
 Always a Bridesmaid (2000 film), American-British documentary by Nina Davenport
 Always a Bridesmaid (TV series), 2010 Canadian television series
 Always a Bridesmaid (2019 film), American romantic comedy film by Trey Haley

See also
 Always the Bridesmaid: Volume I, album by The Decemberists